Classic – Dance of Love is a 2005 Hindi-language Indian film directed by Babbar Subhash, starring Mithun Chakraborty, Vikas Bhardwaj and Meghna Naidu, with Shashi Kiran and Navin Nischol featuring in supporting roles.

Plot 
Guru, Dr. Ram Gopal Acharya teaches his disciples the core difference between paap (Sin) and punya (good deeds). One of his life's thinking is that man should never succumb to temptation and sex to "sinners" and women's only responsibility is to seduce men for money and ultimately destroy them.

Doli, bar dancer dances to entertain her customer, drawing false visions of lust and arousing passion in men through her sensual figure movements, keeping the dream that some day her Prince Charming, riding on a white horse would come and take her away. Meanwhile, she meets Suraj, a London-based NRI, who comes to India for business. Love blossoms between the two and Suraj transforms Doli from a symbol of disgrace into a symbol of pure and noble love.

But unfortunately, Dr. Acharya's loyalty, rather better to tell the wicked side of him, towards his friend J. K. Malhotra, father of Suraj, evokes to insult Doli and calls her a prostitute, sinner, lady of the night, adulteress and blames her for tarnishing Suraj's reputation. Fatigued, Doli finds no way other than the decision to taking refuge in Acharya's ashram. A victorious smile cures his lips, as Acharya cannot resist the lure, the forbidden joy of passion, which he always condemned - SEX.

Doli gradually realises Dr. Acharya's lustful intention to his disciples. Suraj rescues Doli from the evil clutches of Acharya as he tries to forcefully marry her. His heart is set on fire with the longing for Doli and his feet begin to quiver to the tune of wild romance, sex and passion performing this story.

Cast 
 Mithun Chakraborty as Dr. Ramgopal Acharya
 Vikas Bhardwaj as Suraj J. Malhotra
 Meghna Naidu as Doli
 Krishna Bhatt
 Dinesh Hingoo as Sitara's assistant
 Shashi Kiran as Sadanand
Vivek Mishran
 Navin Nischol as J. K. Malhotra
 Gyan Prakash
 Mansee Shah
 Himani Shivpuri as Sitaradevi

Songs
 "Mohabbat Hojaye" - Sukhwinder Singh
 "Classic Dance Of Love" - Sukhwinder Singh
 "Saathi Mere" - Kailash Kher
 "Main Tujhpe Qurbaan" - Sukhwinder Singh
 "Saiyaji" - Shreya Ghoshal
 "Aa Mujhe Dekh" - Sunidhi Chauhan

References

External links 
 

2005 films
Films scored by Bappi Lahiri
2000s Hindi-language films
Films directed by Babbar Subhash
Indian dance films